Capelle-Fermont is a commune in the Pas-de-Calais department in the Hauts-de-France region of France.

Geography
A small village located 10 miles (16 km) northwest of Arras on the D49 road in the Scarpe valley.,

Population

Places of interest
 The church of Notre-Dame, dating from the eleventh century.
 The manor house of Capelle Fermont

The walls bear the arms of Jean Grenet, a mayor of Arras, who died in 1539.
The mansion was restored in 1701 by the Preudhomme de Haillies family.

See also
Communes of the Pas-de-Calais department

References

Capellefermont